National Cycle Network (NCN) Route 10 is a Sustrans National Route that runs from Cockermouth to North Shields.

History
Route 10 forms the majority of the  Reivers Cycle Route which was conceived to be a mirror image of the popular C2C cycle route. Originally Route 10 was designated as Sustrans regional route and signed with blue numbers. It has been reclassified as a national route with red numbers.

Route

Cockermouth to Carlisle
The western trailhead is at Cockermouth. It uses minor roads as far as Dalston where it joins Route 7 and follows the Caldew Cycleway riverside traffic-free path into central Carlisle.

Carlisle to Bellingham
Heading north out of Carlise the route continues to follow Route 7 on minor roads as far as Westlinton and continues as Route 10 into the Kershope Forest where it meets the Scottish border. Mainly traffic-free through the Kielder Forest to the reservoir where it continues on minor roads to Bellingham.

Bellingham to North Shields
Heading east the route follows minor roads to Ponteland. Passing to the north of Newcastle upon Tyne the route reaches its eastern trailhead at Percy Main, North Shields.

Related NCN routes
Route 10 is part of the Reivers Cycle Route along with:

Route 10 meets the following routes:
  at Cockermouth
  at Dalston and Westlinton
  at Bellingham
  at Percy Main

References

External links

Cycleways in England
National Cycle Routes